Douglas Sayer Ji is the founder of the popular alternative medicine portal GreenMedInfo, a website known for promoting various pseudoscientific publications. He was identified in 2020 as one of the largest promoters of COVID-19 misinformation on social media.

Background
Ji obtained a BA in philosophy from Rutgers University in 1995. He previously owned an organic food market in Bonita Springs, Florida.

He is the former editor of the defunct International Journal of Human Nutrition and Functional Medicine and a member of the advisory board and a former vice-president of the National Health Federation, a lobby group opposing government regulation of alternative health practitioners and supplements retailers.

Ji became popular promoting common alternative medicine beliefs, such as enthusiasm for ancient healing practices and the claim that the appearance of some foods is meant to indicate which organ of the human body they are meant to treat. While he earlier had invited his readers to be suspicious of governments, health authorities and pharmaceutical companies, during the COVID-19 pandemic Ji joined other proponents of alternative medicine in embracing conspiracy theories about allegedly oppressive global organizations.

Ji denies being an anti-vaccination activist, but consistently shares false or misleading messages about vaccine safety and efficacy. 

 He lives in Florida.

GreenMedInfo
Ji's website, GreenMedInfo, was founded in 2008. It allows users to search articles from the research portal PubMed on alternative medicine topics. However, tests made in 2019 by the McGill Organization for Science and Society showed only articles appearing to indicate positive results for alternative medicine treatments are displayed as search results through GreenMedInfo, ignoring the large number of research papers denying the effectiveness of alternative medicine.

The website also presents unreliable health and nutrition information, as well as common conspiracy theories, as facts, notably about the efficacy of vaccination. It has been noted for a lack of neutrality and curated toward those papers that confirm his pronouncements and away from those that undermine his pronouncements.  "A colossal exercise in cherry picking."

As of 2021, annual subscription plans to GreenMedInfo range from $75 to $850. In 2019, the website claimed some one million views per month.

Social media disinformation

The Center for Countering Digital Hate identified Ji as one of twelve individuals promoting most of the misinformation that can be found online about vaccines, along with his spouse Kelly Brogan, Robert F. Kennedy Jr., Christiane Northrup, Ty and Charlene Bollinger, and supplement giant Joseph Mercola.

Ji falsely claimed on Facebook that the Pfizer COVID-19 vaccine killed more people than the virus itself. Like Brogan, he also discouraged the public from using face masks to limit the spread of the virus. Other information presented by Ji and GreenMedInfo has been flagged as false or  misleading.

Ji promotes anti-vaccination videos sold by Ty and Charlene Bollinger and receives a commission whenever his referrals result in a sale, a practice known as affiliate marketing.

In 2020, both Twitter and Instagram removed GreenMedInfo from their platform as part of their efforts to limit the spread of misinformation about COVID-19. Pinterest had already banned Ji in 2018.

Bibliography

See also
 America's Frontline Doctors
 Children's Health Defense
 COVID-19 misinformation
 COVID-19 misinformation by governments
 List of conspiracy theories
 List of unproven methods against COVID-19
 Plandemic
 ScienceUpFirst, a Canadian science communication campaign focusing on the pandemic

References

1972 births
Living people
American health activists
American anti-vaccination activists
Alternative medicine activists
American conspiracy theorists
COVID-19 conspiracy theorists